The 1986 Men's World Water Polo Championship was the fifth edition of the men's water polo tournament at the World Aquatics Championships, organised by the world governing body in aquatics, the FINA. The tournament was held from 13 to 23 August 1986, and was incorporated into the 1986 World Aquatics Championships in Madrid, Spain.

This was the only men's world championship to have featured fifteen teams instead of the usual sixteen. Yugoslavia won its first title by defeating Italy in the final. The Soviet Union, the defending champion, came third.

Participating teams

Groups formed

Group A
 
 
 
 

Group B
 
 
 

Group C
 
 
 
 

Group D

First round

Group A

 14 August 1986

 15 August 1986

 16 August 1986

Group B

 14 August 1986

 15 August 1986

 16 August 1986

Group C

 14 August 1986

 15 August 1986

 16 August 1986

Group D

 14 August 1986

 15 August 1986

 16 August 1986

Second round

Group E

Preliminary round results apply.

 18 August 1986

 19 August 1986

Group F

Preliminary round results apply.

 18 August 1986

 19 August 1986

Group G

Preliminary round results apply.

 18 August 1986

 19 August 1986

Group H

Preliminary round results apply.

 18 August 1986

 19 August 1986

Final round

13th – 15th places (Group L)

Results of previous rounds apply.

 21 August 1986

 22 August 1986

9th – 12th places (Group K)

Results of previous rounds apply.

 21 August 1986

 22 August 1986

5th – 8th places (Group J)

Results of previous rounds apply.

 21 August 1986

 22 August 1986

Semifinals

Bronze match

Final

Final ranking

Medalists

References

External links
 5th FINA World Championships 1986, Madrid - Water polo Men's Tournament www.fina.org
 Men Water Polo V World Championship 1986 Madrid www.todor66.com

1986
Men's tournament